Lifastuzumab vedotin (INN; development code DNIB0600A) is an experimental monoclonal antibody-drug conjugate designed for the treatment of cancer.

This drug was developed by Genentech/Roche.

References 

Experimental cancer drugs
Monoclonal antibodies for tumors
Antibody-drug conjugates